Howard Ross may refer to:

Howard Ross (artist) (born 1982), American Director and Artist
Howard Ross (actor) (born 1941), Italian actor
Howard Ross (baseball) (1903–1963), American baseball player
Howard E. Ross (1921–2010), national president of the Canadian Home Builders' Association
Howard Irwin Ross (1907–1974), Chancellor of McGill University

See also
Henry H. Ross (Henry Howard Ross, 1790–1862), member of United States House of Representatives from New York